Krishna Kumar Mantoo Singh is an Indian politician from the Bharatiya Janata Party and was sitting MLA from Amnour Vidhan Sabha constituency. He was an MLA from Amnour Vidhan Sabha constituency from 2010 To 2015.

Early life
Krishna Kumar was born in a Kurmi family. His father Laxmi Narayan Singh is a farmer and he belongs to agricultural family. He belongs to Banauta village, which comes under Parsa police station of Saran district.

Elections Contested

Assembly Elections 2010

Assembly Elections 2015

Assembly Elections 2020

Positions held

See also
 Bihar assembly 2010 election results
 Candidate List for Bihar Assembly (Vidhan Sabha) Elections 2015

References

Janata Dal (United) politicians
Politicians from Patna
Members of the Bihar Legislative Council
Finance Ministers of Bihar
Living people
Bihar MLAs 2010–2015
People from Saran district
Bihar MLAs 2020–2025
1977 births